State Route 165 (SR 165) is an east to west secondary highway in Monroe County, Tennessee, United States that is  long. It is the Tennessee portion of the Cherohala Skyway which runs through Cherokee National Forest and connects Tellico Plains with Robbinsville, North Carolina. Its western terminus is at SR 68 in Tellico Plains and its eastern terminus is at the North Carolina border, where the road continues as North Carolina Highway 143 (NC 143).

Route description

SR 165 begins in Tellico Plains at an intersection with SR 68 on the northwestern edge of downtown. It travels east and straddles the northern edge of downtown to have an intersection with SR 360. The highway then leaves Tellico Plains to enter the Cherokee National Forest to become narrow and curvy, running parallel to the Tellico River for several miles. SR 165 then leaves the river to climb the mountains, where it becomes extremely curvy as it gains altitude. It continues to wind its way east before coming to an end at the North Carolina state line, where the Cherohala Skyway continues as NC 143.

Junction list

References

Tennessee Department of Transportation (24 January 2003). "State Highway and Interstate List 2003".

External links

165
Transportation in Monroe County, Tennessee